Kayangel (Ngcheangel) is the northernmost state of Palau  north of Koror. The population is 54 (2015 census).

History 
The state was colonized by Spain from the end of the 16th century until 1899 when the territory was sold to the German Empire. This situation would continue until the First World War when Japan took control of the atolls. The United States would rule the area from World War II until the independence of Palau

The Palau Parliament passed a joint resolution in January 2005 supporting a 2002 agreement between the Kayangel State and Palau Pacific Energy Inc. (PPE) in 2002, granting the oil company exclusive rights to explore, drill and produce oil in the surrounding marine area for a specified period of time. Initially, the Palau government had opposed this on environmental grounds, but then bowed to a 2003 petition by Kayangel State residents in favor of exploration.

Typhoon Haiyan 
In 2013 Typhoon Haiyan left its wake of destruction on the island, causing Kayangel to be flooded in its entirety, and all homes were destroyed. No fatalities were reported, but 69 people were affected by this cyclone.

Demography 
The population of the state was 54 in the 2015 census and median age was 37.5 years. The official languages of the state are Palauan and English. Rdechor is the title of the traditional high chief from the state.

Political system
The state of Kayangel, with population of less than 60, has an elected chief executive, governor. The state also has a legislature elected every four years. The state population elects one of the member in the House of Delegates of Palau.

Geography 
The state consists of three atolls in different states of development:

Kayangel Atoll

The bottom of the lagoon is largely sand. On the western side of the atoll, there is a small passage for boats into the lagoon, with a depth of only , called Ulach. Coral diversity and abundance are low in the lagoon. Large fish, dolphins and foraging sea turtles are common near the pass.

There are four densely wooded islets on the eastern and southern rim of the oval-shaped atoll, from north to south, are Kayangel, Ngeriungs, Ngerebelas and Orak.

Kayangel Islet

Kayangel Islet (also called Ngcheangel or Ngajangel), is the largest and only inhabited islet of Kayangel Atoll and Kayangel State. There are five villages primarily oriented to the western shore (lagoon side). The villages are very small by any standard, given the aggregate population of only 138. Together, they make up the state capital, Kayangel (Ngcheangel). From north to south:

Orukei
Dilong
Olkang
Dimes

The only power on the island comes from solar panels or personal generators.  There is one small school that goes from K-9th grades and a small library. The only shopping to be done on the island is from a small general store, otherwise it is what the islanders catch in the ocean or grow in the ground. There are several ways to get to the island. One is the island's speedboat that takes about two hours, but it is generally in for repairs. The more reliable modes are from either a local fisherman or a dive company that makes regular trips up to the island to dive off the reefs surrounding the island.

Ngeriungs Islet

There is a small campsite. The islet has been designated an Important Bird Area (IBA) by BirdLife International because it supports a large population of Micronesian megapodes.

Ngerebelas Islet

Orak Islet

Ngaruangel Reef

The lagoon floor is covered with thick sand deposits and thickets of staghorn Acropora. The reef is protected by Ngaruangel Reserve.

Ngaruangel Island

There is one small, barren and uninhabited islet, Ngaruangel Island, in the center of the eastern rim of the atoll, at its easternmost point.

The islet consists almost entirely of pieces of rough coral rock thrown up by surf. Most of the pieces are rough or sharp and are largely of the Acropora reticulata type, or of similar form. Sand and sandy gravel are limited to the lagoon side and the southern tip. The altitude is a little less than one meter above high tide.

There is no vegetation on the islet. Animal life is represented by numerous marine crane flies. Terns are abundant.

Velasco Reef

It is not clearly separated from Ngaruangl Reef and appears as its large but submerged northern extension on satellite images. Much of the reef is uncharted. Heavy wave exposure limits coral diversity and cover on Velasco Reef.

Education
The Ministry of Education operates public schools.

JFK Kayangel Elementary School was built in 1965; initially students took classes in a bai. It relieved the schools in Babeldaob as Kayangel students previously attended those schools. Ngaraard Elementary School in Ngaraard formerly served Kayangel.

Palau High School in Koror is the country's only public high school, so children from this community go there.

References

External links
PUB. 126, SAILING DIRECTIONS (ENROUTE), PACIFIC ISLANDS.
Satellite Images
Atoll Research Bulletin 14: Description of Kayangel Atoll
Atoll Research Bulletin 21 (mostly about Ngaruangel Reef)
Honorary Consulate of the Republic of Palau to the UK &NI

 
States of Palau
Islands of Palau
Important Bird Areas of Palau
Important Bird Areas of the Caroline Islands